Ti conosco mascherina is an album by Italian singer Mina, issued in 1990.

Track listing

CD 1

CD 2

References

1990 albums
Mina (Italian singer) albums